A Chip Off the Old Block (Traditional Chinese: 巴不得爸爸...) is a 2009 TVB television drama from Hong Kong produced and created by Poon Ka Tak. The original broadcast was on the TVB Jade with approximately 45-minute-long episodes airing five days a week. The final two episodes were an hour and a half long each, which aired during the weekends. A Chip Off the Old Block tells the story of the articulate businessman Chor Chi, who accidentally travels back in time to the 1960s and meets his younger father, Chor Fan.

Plot

However, for this pair of Father and son, it is quite difficult because both of them have different characters, different way of doing things, and even their life goals are totally different from each other. Father Chor Fan (Sunny Chan) has feelings still like a man in the 60s, but Son Chor Chi (Ron Ng) finds that he is too slow compared to others who are living in the 21st Century.

Chor Chi from the 21st Century goes back in time to the 60s when his father was in his youth. The Father and Son became best of brothers. Chor Chi offends many people and seldom greets others. Hence, he isn't well liked by other neighbours. There is only Chor Fan who protects him all the time and even introduces him to a job at a departmental store. However, Chor Chi, who is over-ambitious, only knows how to blame his father for being too old-fashioned and allows others to take advantage of him. Chor Chi causes many problems, including causing many other neighbours to lose their homes. When he finally begins to regret his actions and tries to fix them, he finds that he has travelled back to the 21st century...

This is a comedy which shows a travel in time. The circumstances that happen will not only cause positive aftertaste, but allows one to think about the meaning behind "There's no inborn talent to become a powerful person overnight; A good man should work hard and stand up strong on his own feet."

Cast
The tenants

The Dor Dor Department Store personnel

Viewership ratings

Sequel

A second installment, A Chip Off the Old Block II (Chinese: 巴不得媽媽... jyutping: Ba1 Bat1 Dak1 Ma1 Ma1; literally "anxious mother"), was announced in January 2010. However, official production for the sequel did not start until January 2012, with Poon Ka-tak returning to produce. In February 2012, Liza Wang, Mandy Wong, Him Law, and Gigi Wong were announced to star in the sequel. In March 2012, Chung King-fai and Chin Kar-lok were confirmed to join. In April 2012, Jade Leung joined the cast. Leung's last production with TVB was the 2004 blockbuster television drama War and Beauty.

Awards and nominations
TVB Anniversary Awards (2010)
 Nominated: Best Drama - Top 5
 Nominated: Best Actor (Ron Ng)
 Nominated: Best Actress (Myolie Wu)
 Nominated: Best Supporting Actor (John Chiang)
 Nominated: My Favourite Male Character (Sunny Chan)
 Nominated: My Favourite Female Character (Myolie Wu)

International Broadcast
  - 8TV (Malaysia)

References

External links
TVB.com A Chip Off the Old Block - Official Website 

TVB dramas
2009 Hong Kong television series debuts
2009 Hong Kong television series endings